The canton of La Teste-de-Buch is an administrative division of the Gironde department, southwestern France. Its borders were modified at the French canton reorganisation which came into effect in March 2015. Its seat is in La Teste-de-Buch.

It consists of the following communes:
Arcachon
La Teste-de-Buch

References

Cantons of Gironde